Oscar Wilson may refer to:
Oscar Wilson (artist) (18671930), English painter and illustrator
Red Wilson (musician) or Oscar O. Wilson (19202005), American musician and fiddle-maker